Hypericum delphicum is a perennial herb in the St. John's wort family Hypericaceae, section Adenosepalum  and the subsection Adenosepalum. It has a diploid number of 16.

Distribution and habitat 
Hypericum delphicum is located in the Evvoia and Andros regions of Greece, and can be found in damp and shady places among rocks. The species typically grows at the altitudes of 300-1700 meters above sea level.

Description 
The plant has an herbaceous taproot from which grow many stems. The stems lack branches below the inflorescence. The sessile leaves have an obtuse base and a rounded tip.

References 

Plants described in 1854
delphicum
Taxa named by Pierre Edmond Boissier
Taxa named by Theodor von Heldreich